John Carlin (6 November 1929 – 19 November 2017) was a Scottish actor. He appeared on television from 1957 to 1992 and has 109 credits from films and television series.

Early years
Carlin was born on 6 November 1929 in Johnstone, Scotland, and he attended the Glasgow College of Dramatic Art.

Career 
In the late 1950s, Carlin acted with the Birmingham Repertory Theatre. He made his radio debut in 1955 on the Children's Hour and went on to appear in a number of television programmes in the 1960s. Also in the 1960s he worked as a disc jockey on the BBC's Light Programme.

Death
Carlin died on 19 November 2017 in Gloucestershire, England.

Filmography

Television roles

References

External links 

1929 births
2017 deaths
British male film actors
People from Johnstone